Evesham railway station is in the town of Evesham in Worcestershire, England. It is operated by Great Western Railway. Trains to  take about 1 hour 45 minutes. It is one of the few railway stations in the United Kingdom to have shown a steady (if relatively small) decline in use since 2004 (see usage figures, below right).

History
Evesham was a terminus for just over a year, until the last major section of the OWW, from Evesham to Wolvercot Junction (to the north of ), was opened on 4 June 1853. The OWW became the West Midland Railway in 1860, which in turn merged with the Great Western Railway in 1863.

On 11 November 1860 a luggage train collided with another which was stationary at Evesham station. Four carriages were badly damaged and the engine and tender were derailed. One of the drivers was badly scalded and taken to Worcester Infirmary.

On 21 October 1862 the 7.55pm express passenger train from Oxford to Worcester was passing through Evesham at 9.10pm at a speed of around 40 to 45 mph, it came into collision with three trucks west of the passenger platform. The driver of the train, Henry Crompton, was injured when the locomotive was derailed by the impact. The inquiry into the accident by Captain Tyler R.E. found that the foreman-porter James Callow or the horse-boy Daniel Langstone (aged 17) must have shunted the trucks onto the main line and then forgotten about them. The local magistrates fined the fore-man-porter £10 and the horse boy £5.

Facing the present (former OWW) station across the car park is the former Midland Railway station of 1864 by the architect George Hunt on the Ashchurch to  Evesham loop line.

On 2 June 1885, Mark Butler, under goods guard on the Midland Railway was crushed to death while coupling wagons at Evesham station. The inquest found that although coupling sticks were provided they were seldom used. Bulter was caught by a buffer whilst going between them and the verdict was accidental death.

The stations were operated separately until 1932. It was then agreed to run them as a joint station when the G.W.R. stationmaster, E.T. Holloway took control of the G.W.R. and L.M.S. goods departments, and H.J. King the newly appointed station master at the L.M.S. station took full charge of passenger departments at the two stations. At the time of this arrangement, there were 47 staff in the passenger department alone. 

The Midland station closed to passenger traffic in June 1963 and completely a year later. The original timber buildings from this station were taken to build Monsal Dale railway station in Derbyshire; the replacement stone structure still stands and is used for office accommodation.  The rest of the site has been redeveloped as a housing estate.

Services
Before December 2019, services at Evesham were irregular with gaps of between 40 mins and 2 hours between services.

As of December 2019, Great Western Railway now provide a more regular service to the station. The current off-peak service in trains per hour is:
 1 tph to London Paddington

References

Bibliography

External links

Evesham Station on navigable 1946 O.S. map

Railway stations in Worcestershire
DfT Category E stations
Former Great Western Railway stations
Former Midland Railway stations
Railway stations in Great Britain opened in 1852
Railway stations in Great Britain opened in 1864
Railway stations served by Great Western Railway
Railway station
1852 establishments in England
George Hunt railway stations